Bujayeh (also Romanized as Būjāyeh; also known as Būjā’ī, Bū Jā’ī, Būjā’ī, Būjāneh, and Bū Jāneh-ye Bālā) is a village in Ahandan Rural District, in the Central District of Lahijan County, Gilan Province, Iran. At the 2006 census, its population was 3,186, in 888 families.

References 

Populated places in Lahijan County